Gone Away may refer to:
Gone Away (EP), by Die Kreuzen, 1989
"Gone Away" (song) from Ixnay on the Hombre by The Offspring, 1997
Goneaway National Park, a park in Central West Queensland, Australia